ICICI Lombard General Insurance Company Limited is a general insurance company in India. It is engaged in general insurance, reinsurance, insurance claims management and investment management.
The company has a Gross Written Premium (GWP) of ₹143.20 billion (FY 2021). The firm offers policy insurance and renewal through its intermediaries and website. It markets assurance products including Car Insurance, Health Insurance, International Travel Insurance, Overseas Student Travel Insurance, Two Wheeler Insurance, Home Insurance and Weather insurance. ICICI Lombard has 273 branches and 840 virtual offices spread across the nation.

History 
Established in 2001, ICICI Lombard General Insurance Company is a joint venture between ICICI Bank- India’s second largest bank and Fairfax Financial Holdings Limited-  a financial services company based in Toronto. ICICI Bank had 64% stake in the venture while Fairfax had 36% in the joint venture. ICICI Lombard General Insurance is the largest private sector general insurance company in India. In fiscal 2016, ICICI Bank sold a 9.0% stake in ICICI General to its joint venture partner, Fairfax Financial Holdings, at a company valuation of ₹172.25 billion. Following the transaction, the share ownership in ICICI Lombard General Insurance Company of ICICI Bank and Fairfax Financial Holdings Limited is approximately 64% and 35%, respectively. On 16th October 2019, FAL Corporation, part of Fairfax Financial Holdings, on Wednesday exited ICICI Lombard General Insurance Company Ltd. by selling shares worth nearly Rs 2,627 crore.

ICICI Lombard tied up with Karur Vysa Bank in 2019 for selling bancassurance products in 2019.

In August 2020, ICICI Lombard acquired Bharti Axa General Insurance through a share swap deal. The deal will enable Bharti AXA's current shareholders receive 2 shares of ICICI Lombard for every 115 shares of Bharti AXA held. The merger will result in a combined annual premiums worth .

Financials

ICICI Lombard's Gross Written Premium (GWP) was ₹143.2 billion in fiscal 2021. ICICI Lombard had the second highest industry market share of 8.30 percent in the general insurance market as of February 2022. ICICI Lombard’s profit before tax increased from ₹16.97 billion in fiscal 2020 to ₹19.54 billion in fiscal 2021. ICICI Lombard’s profit after tax increased from ₹11.94 billion in fiscal 2020 to ₹14.74 billion in fiscal 2021.

Key people 

 Bhargav Dasgupta as Managing Director and CEO
 Sanjay Datta as Chief Underwriting, Claims and Reinsurance
 Alok Agarwal - Executive Director
 Sanjiv Mantri - Executive Director
 Gopal Balachandran - CFO
 Prasun Sarkar - Appointed Actuary
 Vinod Mahajan - Chief Investment Officer

Footnotes

References

External links 

2001 establishments in Maharashtra
Financial services companies established in 2001
Indian companies established in 2001
Financial services companies based in Mumbai
General insurance companies of India
ICICI Bank
Multinational joint-venture companies
Fairfax Financial
Companies listed on the National Stock Exchange of India
Companies listed on the Bombay Stock Exchange